Omowumi Ogunrotimi is a Nigerian multidisciplinary legal practitioner, founder and executive director of Gender Mobile Initiative. She has worked in over 50 rural communities advocating for safe spaces for vulnerable populations, particularly girls and women.

Ogunrotimi's initiated and spearheaded cluster of initiatives has benefited over one hundred thousand (100,000) women and girls.

At the 2018 Commonwealth Heads of Government Meeting, Omowumi was named one of the 20 young persons from across the 53 countries of the Commonwealth, who have been doing exceptional developmental works. She is an Associate of the Royal Commonwealth Society. She was awarded one of the top ten Gender justice Activists on the continent of Africa by the Institute for Justice and Reconciliation in South Africa. Ogunrotimi is currently the Deputy Head of the Sectoral Committee on Women and Gender, African Union Economic, Social and Cultural Council (AU-ECOSOCC), Nigeria. In 2018, she was on the List of recipients of Ten Outstanding Young Persons of the World, JCI 10 Outstanding Young Persons (JCI TOYP).

Gender Mobile Initiative

Omowumi is the founder of Gender Mobile Initiative (GMI), which complements the policy and program effort of government and critical stakeholders in advancing gender equality and eliminating gender-based violence through policy advocacy, technology adoption, research, service delivery, public awareness, capacity strengthening, legal and economic empowerment.

GMI initiated the Campus Safety Initiative, which supports institutions of higher learning to sustainably address sexual harassment through innovative policies, bystander intervention and technology integration for effective case management, which were largely  non-existent in Nigeria before now.

Recognition

Omowumi Ogunrotimi, was shortlisted for the 2018 Commonwealth Youth Programme Awards as the only Nigerian in recognition of her contribution towards the achievement of the Sustainable Development Goal 5, gender equality, in Nigeria. The award recognises outstanding young people aged 15 to 29, whose innovative projects and programmes have had a significant impact on their communities.

Awards
 2017: top ten Gender Justice Activist by IJR South Africa.
2018: Mandela Washington Fellowship Alumni Award recipient; and

References 

Living people
Youth in Nigeria
Nigerian women activists
Nigerian women lawyers
Yoruba legal professionals
Commonwealth of Nations awards
Commonwealth Heads of Government Meetings
Fellows of the Royal Commonwealth Society
Year of birth missing (living people)